North Rode railway station originally North Rode junction served the village of North Rode, Cheshire.

The station was some distance from the village and traffic was sparse however the station remained open until 1962 when it closed completely,  passenger traffic between North Rode and Leek having been withdrawn in 1960.

Route

References
Notes

Sources

Disused railway stations in Cheshire
Railway stations in Great Britain closed in 1962
Railway stations in Great Britain opened in 1849
Former North Staffordshire Railway stations
1849 establishments in England